Dávid Kovács (born on 15th of March 1976 in Budapest) is a Hungarian politician, historian and former founding member of the Jobbik – Movement for a Better Hungary. He served as inaugural president of the party from 2003 to 2006. After resigning of politics in 2008, he became 
an assistant professor of history at the "Károli Gáspár" University of the Reformed Church Hungary.

Biography
Dávid Kovács was born in Budapest on 15th of March 1976 as the younger son of Dr. Etele Kovács, Vice Dean at the University of Physical Education (TF) and Valéria Végh, a former elementary school teacher.

During his presidency the Jobbik established a coalition with the Hungarian Justice and Life Party (see: MIÉP–Jobbik Third Way Alliance of Parties) for the 2006 Hungarian parliamentary election. After the election, when the party alliance failed to win any parliamentary seats, he was succeeded by Gábor Vona, Kovács becoming one of the deputy chairmen of the Jobbik.

He did not support the establishment of the Magyar Gárda, insofar as he left the party along with two prominent founding members on 10th of March 2008.

References 

1976 births
Living people
Politicians from Budapest
Jobbik politicians
21st-century Hungarian politicians
Hungarian nationalists